Willie Peters (born 1 March 1979) is an Australian professional rugby league coach who is the head coach of the Hull Kingston Rovers in the Betfred Super League and a former professional rugby league footballer. He had also previously played for the St George Illawarra Dragons as well as in England for Gateshead, Widnes and Wigan.

Background
Willie Peters was born in Sydney, Australia.

Playing career
While playing for Souths in the 1990s, coach Craig Coleman declared that Peters could be the next Peter Sterling.
In 1999, Peters joined Gateshead before joining Wigan in 2000.  Peters played for the Wigan Warriors at scrum half back in their 2000 Super League Grand Final loss against St Helens R.F.C.

In 2001, Peters joined St. George playing with the club for two seasons before returning to Souths in 2003.  Peters played his two final seasons in Australia with South Sydney where the club finished with back to back wooden spoons.  In 2004, Peters joined Widnes and played one season with the club before retiring.

Post playing
In 2016, Peters became head coach of the Wests Tigers Holden Cup team.
In 2017, Peters became the Assistant Coach at Manly Warringah Sea Eagles.  Peters than became an NRL Assistant coach under Wayne Bennett at the South Sydney Rabbitohs in 2019, before linking with the Newcastle Knights in 2020 as Assistant Coach.

In May 2022, Peters was named as the new coach of Hull Kingston Rovers, succeeding Tony Smith. Peters took charge at the end of the 2022 season.

Controversy
On 15 September 2017, Peters left his position at Manly after it was alleged he had been involved in a fight with another Manly staff member at a pub in The Rocks, Sydney.  Peters was issued with an infringement notice by police for offensive behaviour.

The Manly club later released a statement which read "The Sea Eagles will not tolerate misconduct and expect all employees to represent the club at the highest standard," Manly owner and chairman Scott Penn said. "All employees agree to the club's code of conduct and know what is expected of them. We must uphold these standards and will not accept any avoidable breach of conduct".

References

External links
Willie Peters at stats.rleague.com
Souths release Peters, sign Cusack

1979 births
Living people
Australian people of Greek descent
Australian rugby league players
Hull Kingston Rovers coaches
Newcastle Thunder players
Rugby league halfbacks
Rugby league players from Sydney
South Sydney Rabbitohs players
St. George Illawarra Dragons players
Widnes Vikings players
Wigan Warriors players